Rajakhedi is a census town in Sagar district in the Indian state of Madhya Pradesh.

Demographics
At the 2001 India census, Rajakhedi had a population of 19,023. Males constituted 53% of the population and females 47%. Rajakhedi had an average literacy rate of 73%, higher than the national average of 59.5%: male literacy was 79%, and female literacy 67%. 15% of the population was under 6 years of age. Rajakhedi was once the largest gram panchayat in India.

References

Sagar, Madhya Pradesh